Brittany Tomlinson (born May 10, 1997), known professionally as Brittany Broski, is an American social media personality, comedian and singer. She initially gained fame after a video of her tasting kombucha for the first time went viral on TikTok in August 2019. As of October 2022, she has 7.2 million followers and over 320 million likes on TikTok.

Early life
Brittany Tomlinson was born on May 10, 1997, and raised in Dallas, Texas. She participated in theater growing up, acting in local productions of The Addams Family, Bus Stop, and Spamalot. During both high school and college, she was a part of her schools' improv troupes.

She graduated from Texas A&M University magna cum laude in 2018 with a degree in communications. She subsequently worked at a call center but left after it made her depressed. She then worked in trust and investment services at a bank, where she was fired after her boss discovered the kombucha video and determined that Tomlinson's viral fame would put the company in jeopardy. She is also a licensed insurance agent.

Career
Tomlinson created her TikTok account in June 2019 at the request of her friends, originally using the handle @brittanyt445. She posted her first video, a Snapchat video about her "depression meal", which quickly went viral, a month later.

She subsequently posted her most viral video, wherein she tastes cherry cola-flavored kombucha for the first time with rapidly changing facial expressions, in August 2019. The video first gained notoriety on "gay Twitter" after being reposted with sexually-charged captions, eventually gaining traction on Reddit and Twitter, earning over 40 million views on the latter platform. The video also became a popular reaction image on social media and was ranked by TikTok as one of the top ten most viral videos of 2019 posted to the platform. Its popularity earned her the nickname "Kombucha Girl". In the Huffington Post, Broski has been described as the "Patron Saint of Memes," and Buzzfeed referred to her as a "TikTok star."

Following the success of the kombucha video, Tomlinson was signed to Influences Management and later to United Talent Agency. 
In late 2019, Tomlinson moved to Los Angeles with her friend and fellow TikToker Sarah Schauer and the two have been making YouTube videos together since. She appeared in an advertisement for Sabra hummus during Super Bowl LIV. In early 2020 she competed on the second season of the YouTube reality show The Reality House hosted by JC Caylen and Kian Lawley; she was eliminated in the first episode. In August 2020, she was featured in an episode of the Awesomeness web television series Dish This. She was nominated for a Subject Award in Comedy at the 10th Streamy Awards. She co-hosted the TikTok New Year's Eve Party live event with American rapper Lil Yachty in December 2020. After she used the song "Remy the Ratatouille" in a video, the song went viral, inspiring the creation of Ratatouille the Musical. In early 2021 Tomlinson became the host of TikTok's official podcast, For You. She has since guest starred on Trixie Mattel and Katya Zamolodchikova's podcast The Bald and the Beautiful, made three guest appearances on Chris Klemens' podcast Unhinged, and joined Trevor Evarts for the first episode of his podcast Trevor Talks Too Much. In 2022, she appeared on Good Mythical Morning, hosted by Rhett and Link, as well as H3Podcast.

On January 10, 2022, the first episode of Tomlinson's internet-themed podcast Violating Community Guidelines, co-hosted with Sarah Schauer and produced by Studio71, debuted. The podcast was nominated for two Signal Awards in 2023 in the categories of Best "Buddy" Podcast and Popular Culture & Variety. On December 5, 2022, "Episode Forty-Eight: Series Finale" of Violating Community Guidelines was uploaded with no explanation for the series' abrupt end.

Public image 
In 2020, Josh Kaplan of The Telegraph called Tomlinson "one of TikTok's biggest stars". Writing for i-D, Tom Prior referred to her as a "TikTok superstar" and named a video of her rapping in the voice of English singer Adele as one of the 20 best TikToks of 2020. L'Officiel included her on their list of "People Who Made Us Laugh in 2020".

Filmography

Television

Web series

Podcasts

Awards and nominations

References

1997 births
American TikTokers
Entertainers from Dallas
Living people
YouTubers from Texas
Texas A&M University alumni